Georges Mounin, born Louis Leboucher, who also wrote under the pseudonym Jean Boucher (June 20, 1910 – January 10, 1993) was a French linguist, translator and semiotician. He was active in the French Resistance and the French Communist Party.

Life
Louis Julien Leboucher was the son of a glass-maker. He started using the pseudonym 'Georges Mounin' in 1943, to escape censorship by the Vichy government. A member of the French Communist Party, he was also active in the French Resistance.

As a linguist, Mounin was a disciple of André Martinet. He was an Italianist who wrote on the theory of translation, the history of linguistics, stylistics and semiology.

Conrad Bureau, a former student of Mounin's, compiled an exhaustive 950-item bibliography of his writings.

Works
 Problèmes théoriques de la traduction (Theoretical problems of translation), 1963.
 Histoire de la linguistique des origines au XXe siecle (History of linguistics from its origins to the 20th century), 1967
 Dictionnaire de la linguistique (Dictionary of linguistics), 1974
 Semiotic praxis: Studies in pertinence and in the means of expression and communication. Translated by Catherine Tihanyi with Maia and Bruce Wise, and with the collaboration of Vladimir Milicic and Josef Nix. London: Plenum, 1985.
 Teoria e storia della traduzione. Milano: Einaudi, 1990.

References

1910 births
1993 deaths
Linguists from France
French semioticians
French translation scholars
20th-century linguists
20th-century French translators